Emerald Eyes is the fourth studio album by German speed metal band Iron Angel, released on 2 October 2020 by Mighty Music. A music video was made for "Sands of Time", and two promo videos were made for "Sacred Slaughter" and "Bridges Are Burning".

Track listing

Personnel
Dirk Schröder – vocals
Robert Altenbach – guitars
Nino Helfrich – guitars
Didy Mackel – bass
Maximilian Behr – drums

Guest musician
 Nico-Collin Schröder – backing vocals

Production
Jan Kirchner – mixing, producer, mastering, engineering

References

2020 albums
Iron Angel albums
Mighty Music albums